David Maxwell may refer to:

 David Maxwell (academic) (born 1944), president of Drake University in Des Moines, Iowa
 David Maxwell (historian) (born 1963), Dixie Professor of Ecclesiastical History at Cambridge University
 David Maxwell (musician) (1943–2015), American blues pianist
 David Maxwell (politician) (born 1943), Iowa State Representative
 David Maxwell (rower) (born 1951), British rower
 David Farrow Maxwell (1900–1985), president of the American Bar Association

See also
 David Maxwell Fyfe, 1st Earl of Kilmuir (1900–1967), British Conservative politician, lawyer and judge